Magic Beyond Words: The J.K. Rowling Story is a made-for-TV film starring actress Poppy Montgomery.  It is based on the book J.K. Rowling A Biography, by Sean Smith, detailing the journey of struggling single mother J. K. Rowling, her bid to become a published author, and her rise to fame that followed the publication of Harry Potter and the Philosopher's Stone.

The film, shot in British Columbia, Canada, aired on Lifetime on July 18, 2011.

Cast
Poppy Montgomery as J. K. Rowling
Emily Holmes as Diane Rowling
Sarah Desjardins as young Diane Rowling
Janet Kidder as Anne Rowling
Paul McGillion as Peter Rowling
Antonio Cupo as Jorge Arantes
Andrew Kavadas as John Nettleship

Awards
The film won Canadian Screen Awards 2013 in category for Best Dramatic Mini-Series or TV Film. Poppy Montgomery was also nominated in category for Lead actress in television film or miniseries, but lost to Emily Osment.

External links
Magic Beyond Words The J.K. Rowling Story Movie - Official Site  myLifetime.com

J.K. Rowling Magic Beyond Words

2011 television films
2011 films
Lifetime (TV network) films
Films shot in British Columbia
J. K. Rowling
Gemini and Canadian Screen Award for Best Television Film or Miniseries winners
Films directed by Paul A. Kaufman